Hiroyuki Kada is a Japanese politician who is a member of the House of Councillors of Japan.

Biography 

In 1993, he graduated from Konan University and joined the newspaper The Kobe Shimbun Company. He worked as Official Secretary to Toru Okutani, then a member of the House of Representatives. 
In 2003, he was in the Hyogo Prefectural Assembly for four terms, serving as Vice-Chairperson for a term.
In 2018, Yoshiharu Konoike died in office, so he decided to run for office.

As of 2022, he serves as Parliamentary Vice-Minister of Justice.

He has met with multiple foreign officials to strength law and cooperation.

References

External links 

Official site
Official Twitter Profile

1970 births

Living people
Konan University alumni
Members of the House of Councillors (Japan)